Jason Wakeling (born 24 May 1968) is a competitive pistol shooter from New Zealand. At the 1998 Commonwealth Games he won a silver medal in the men's 25 metre rapid fire pistol pairs event, partnering Alan Earle.

Highest official ISSF World ranking was 14th for 25m Olympic Rapid Fire Pistol in April 2002.

Represented New Zealand for 18 years (1988 - 2006).

Winner of 76 NZ National shooting titles over 19 different shooting disciplines.

References

New Zealand male sport shooters
Living people
1968 births
Commonwealth Games silver medallists for New Zealand
Shooters at the 1994 Commonwealth Games
Shooters at the 1998 Commonwealth Games
Shooters at the 2002 Commonwealth Games
Shooters at the 2006 Commonwealth Games
Commonwealth Games medallists in shooting
Medallists at the 1998 Commonwealth Games